The following lists events that happened in 1982 in Iceland.

Incumbents
President – Vigdís Finnbogadóttir 
Prime Minister – Gunnar Thoroddsen

Events

Births

5 January – Kristín Anna Valtýsdóttir, musician
9 January – Grétar Steinsson, footballer.
24 March – Bryndís Björgvinsdóttir, folklorist
1 April – Gunnar Heiðar Þorvaldsson, footballer
13 October – Kári Árnason, footballer

Deaths
9 December – Ásmundur Sveinsson, sculptor (b. 1893)

References

 
1980s in Iceland
Years of the 20th century in Iceland